Zoé Oldenbourg (31 March 1916 – 8 November 2002) was a Russian-born French popular historian and novelist who specialized in medieval French history, in particular the Crusades and Cathars.

Life
She was born in Petrograd, Russia into a family of scholars and historians. Her father Sergei was a journalist and historian, her mother Ada Starynkevich was a mathematician, and her grandfather Sergei was the permanent secretary of the Russian Academy of Sciences in Saint Petersburg. Her early childhood was spent among the privations of the Russian revolutionary period and the first years of Communism. Her father fled the country and established himself as a journalist in Paris.

With her family, she emigrated to Paris in 1925 at the age of nine and graduated from the Lycée Molière in 1934 with her Baccalauréat diploma. She went on to study at the Sorbonne and then she studied painting at the Académie Ranson. In 1938 she spent a year in England and studied theology. During World War II she supported herself by hand-painting scarves.

She was encouraged by her father to write and she completed her first work, a novel, Argile et cendres in 1946. Although she wrote her first works in Russian, as an adult she wrote almost exclusively in French.

She married Heinric Idalovici in 1948 and had two children, Olaf and Marie-Agathe.

Work
She combined a high level of scholarship with a deep feeling for the Middle Ages in her historical novels. Her first novel, The World is Not Enough, offered a panoramic view of the twelfth century.  Her second, The Cornerstone, was a Book-of-the-Month Club selection in America.  Other works include The Awakened, The Chains of Love, Massacre at Montsegur, Destiny of Fire, Cities of the Flesh, and Catherine the Great, a Literary Guild selection.  In The Crusades, Zoe Oldenbourg returned to writing about the Middle Ages.

Awards
She won the Prix Femina for her 1953 novel La Pierre Angulaire.

List of works
 Argile et Cendres (1946), published in English as The World is Not Enough (translated by Willard A. Trask).
 La Pierre Angulaire (1953), published in English as The Corner-stone (translated by Edward Hyams).
 Réveillés de la vie (1956).
 Les irréductibles: roman (1958).
 Le Bûcher de Montségur (1959), non-fiction, published in English as Massacre at Montségur: A History of the Albigensian Crusade (translated by Peter Green).
 Les Brûlés (1960), published in English as Destiny of Fire (translated by Peter Green).
 Les Cités Charnelles: ou, l'Histoire de Roger de Montbrun: roman (1961), published in English as Cities of the flesh: or, The story of Roger de Montbrun (Translated by Anne Carter).
 Les Croisades (1965), non-fiction, published in English as The Crusades (1966, translated by Anne Carter).
 Catherine de Russie (1964?), published in English as Catherine the Great (1965, translated by Anne Carter).
 La Joie des Pauvres (1970), published in English as The Heirs of the Kingdom (translated by Anne Carter).
 Saint Bernard. Textes de Saint Bernard, Abélard, Pierre le Vénérable, Geoffroi de Clairvaux, Bérenger de Poitiers, Bossuet (1970).
 Que vous a donc fait Israël? (1974).
 Visages d'un Autoportrait (1977).
 La joie-souffrance (1980).
 Le Procès du Rêve (1982).
 L'eveque et la vieille dame, ou, La belle-mere de Peytavi Borsier: Pièce en dix tableaux et un prologue (1983)
 Que nous est Hécube?, ou, Un plaidoyer pour l'humain : essai (1984)
 Les amours égarées: roman (1987).
 Déguisements: nouvelles (1989).
 Aliénor: pièce en quatre tableaux (1992)

References

Further reading
  Steinberg, Theodore L., "The Use and Abuse of Medieval History: Four Contemporary Novelists and the First Crusade", Studies in Medievalism, II.1 (Fall 1982), pp. 77–93.
 Wilson, Katharina M., (editor), An Encyclopedia of continental women writers, New York : Garland Pub., 1991. . Cf. entry for Zoé Oldenbourg, Volume 1, pp.935–937.

External links
 Photograph of Zoé Oldenbourg at Babelio
 1953 Press photograph of Zoé Oldenbourg

French historical novelists
Prix Femina winners
Writers from Paris
1916 births
2002 deaths
Historians of the Crusades
Soviet emigrants to France
20th-century French novelists